The unicolor cribo (Drymarchon melanurus unicolor) is a Central American subspecies of the cribo snakes. The eastern indigo snake, Drymarchon corais couperi is another species of this genus. Until recently the unicolor cribo was considered a subspecies of the same species as the indigo snake Drymarchon corais unicolor.

Unlike the indigo snake, which is dark blue to almost black, the unicolor cribo has a yellow or golden color with black facial and neck bar-like markings. 

This snake reaches a length of over nine feet. It is terrestrial and diurnal. It can be found in marshes, swamps, and riverbeds. The unicolor cribo is non-venomous. It bites its prey without coiling around it. It pins its prey, crushing it, and then swallows it whole. Its prey consists of other snakes, including venomous snakes, small mammals, small birds, lizards, frogs, fish, and other small vertebrate animals.

References
 Savage, J.M. 1992. The Amphibians and Reptiles of Costa Rica. The University of Chicago Press, Chicago, IL.
 Solorzano, Alejandro. 2004. Snakes of Costa Rica. INBio, Costa Rica.

External links
 Picture and care info
 Indigo systematics

Colubrids
Subspecies